Jericho Creek is a tributary of Eagle Spring Lake in Waukesha County, Wisconsin, in the United States.

References

Rivers of Wisconsin
Rivers of Waukesha County, Wisconsin